Rackard is a surname. Notable people with the surname include:

 Billy Rackard (1930–2009), Irish sportsperson, brother of Nicky and Bobby
 Bobby Rackard (1927–1996), Irish sportsperson
 Nicky Rackard (1922–1976), Irish sportsperson
 Nicky Rackard Cup

See also
 Rickard